La Aramuaca Airport  is an airport serving the city of San Miguel in San Miguel Department, El Salvador.

See also

Transport in El Salvador
 List of airports in El Salvador

References

External links
 OurAirports - La Aramuaca
 OpenStreetMap - La Aramuaca
 HERE Maps - La Aramuaca
 FalllingRain - La Aramuaca Airport

Airports in El Salvador
San Miguel Department (El Salvador)